Vexillum extraneum is an extinct species of sea snail, a marine gastropod mollusk, in the family Costellariidae, the ribbed miters.

Distribution
Fossils of this marine species were found in Eocene strata in Picardy, France.

References

  Cossmann (M.), 1899 - Essais de Paléoconchologie comparée. livraison 3, p. 1-201 
 Cossmann (M.) & Pissarro (G.), 1911 - Iconographie complète des coquilles fossiles de l'Éocène des environs de Paris, t. 2, p. pl. 26-45
 Le Renard, J. & Pacaud, J. (1995). Révision des mollusques Paléogènes du Bassin de Paris. II. Liste des références primaires des espèces. Cossmanniana. 3: 65–132.

External links
 Deshayes, G. P. (1864-1865). Description des animaux sans vertèbres découverts dans le bassin de Paris pour servir de supplément à la Description des coquilles fossiles des environs de Paris comprenant une revue générale de toutes les espèces actuellement connues. Tome troisiéme. Mollusques céphalés, deuxième partie. Mollusques céphalopodes. 1-667, pls 63-107. Paris, Baillière

extraneum
Gastropods described in 1865